Sembawang Shopping Centre is a four-storey commercial development located along Sembawang Road in Sembawang Spring Estate of Sembawang, Singapore. It was first opened in 1986 and underwent a refurbishment in 2007 and reopened in late 2008. In April 2018, the Centre was sold to Lian Beng-Apricot Sembawang.

History
Sembawang Shopping Centre was developed by CapitaLand Mall Trust on a freehold land. It consists of four retail stories (including one Basement).

The mall underwent a refurbishment in 2007 and reopened on 1 December 2008. The architectural firm involved in the redesigning of the mall is DCA Architects. In April 2018, with Colliers International as the estate agent, the Centre was sold to a joint venture of Lian Beng Group and Apricot Capital (Lian Beng-Apricot Sembawang) in an attempt to diversify the portfolio of CapitaLand Mall Trust. This was for an amount of S$248 million, an amount that is double the valuation of the mall as well as the largest sum for any private dedicated mall in Singapore for the immediate few years of time. After the purchase, Knight Frank Property Asset Management Pte Ltd is the managing agent for the mall.

Locality 
The shopping mall is a landmark along Sembawang Road, and is located within the vicinity of landed Sembawang Spring Estate.

Awards

References

External links
 

Shopping malls in Singapore
Places in Singapore
Sembawang